Invasive monitoring may refer to:

 Mass surveillance or Surveillance that leads to privacy breaches
 Monitoring (medicine)